La signorina (i.e. It is based on a novel by Gerolamo Rovetta.

Plot
The young daughter of a libertine is placed in the care of a novelist, who agrees to be her father. The novelist also finds a boy suitable for her as a husband but later discovers that he is his woman's lover. Despite these and other twists, the happy ending sees love blossom between the pupil and his guardian.

Cast

Loredana as Lulù 
Nino Besozzi as  Francesco Roero 
Laura Nucci as Fani 
Alberto Sordi as Nino
Paolo Stoppa as Fani's lover 
Leda Gloria
Maria Jacobini
Giacomo Moschini
Giovanni Varni
Nino Marchesini
Lydia Johnson
Liana Del Balzo

See also
 List of Italian films of 1942

References

External links

Italian romantic drama films
1942 romantic drama films
1942 films
Italian black-and-white films
Films directed by Ladislao Kish
1940s Italian films